Love Sign is the second and final studio album by rock band Free Energy. It was released in January 2013 on the group's own label. The album was produced by John Agnello.

Track list

References

2013 albums
Free Energy (band) albums
Albums produced by John Agnello